Moshe Kelman (2 September 1923 – 19 December 1980) was an Israeli military officer.

Early life
Kelman was born in Mazkeret Batya and was raised in Ness Ziona, Rehovot, and Ramat HaSharon. He joined the Haganah at age 15. In 1940 he moved to Ein Harod and joined the Palmach the following year. He became an officer in the Palmach.

1947
During early 1947 Kelman was ordered by the Haganah High Command to supervise the execution and burial of a Jew accused of collaborating with the British. The execution took place at Kibbutz Dafna.

With the outbreak of the 1947-48 Civil War in Mandatory Palestine, Kelman was a senior member of the Palmach. Following the Al-Khisas raid, 18 December 1947, when a woman member of the Palmach refused to throw a grenade into a room in which she could hear a child crying, Kelman argued that women should not be used on front line duties but should be used as "cooks and service people."

1948
On 15 February 1948, Kelman led a force of 60 men which attacked the remote village Sa'sa', in the Upper Galilee. The operation coincided with a number of other attacks on Arab targets. Its intention was to demonstrate that no village was beyond the reach of the Haganah and to restore Jewish public morale following the deaths of 35 members of the Haganah attempting to reach the outpost of Kfar Etzion a month previously. According to the Haganah's official history, the village was a base for Arab fighters. Kelman had orders to "blow up twenty houses and kill the largest possible number of fighters." During the nighttime attack ten houses where destroyed or damaged and "tens" of people killed. Kelman is quoted as saying 35 houses were demolished and 60 - 80 killed.

In April 1948, he became operational commander of the Palmach's Third Battalion.

On 1 May, he commanded the 3rd Battalion's attack on Ein al-Zeitun as part of Operation Yiftach. Two or three days later, Kelman ordered the shooting of "70 or so" Arab prisoners in a gully close to Safad, many of them young men taken prisoner at Ein al-Zeitun. Afterwards a female member of the Palmach, Netiva Ben-Yehuda, was ordered, with others, to the untie ropes from the dead when it was feared that the bodies might be discovered by members of the Red Cross who were visiting the area. Ilan Pappe states that one of the reasons for this and "many other mass killings" was that the Haganah did not have facilities for large numbers of prisoners.

On 6 May, he led the first attack on Safad but his troops failed to capture the town.

On 8 June 1948, during one of the unsuccessful attacks on Latrun, Kelman led three companies and was forced to retreat under fire. He also commanded troops rounding up members of the Irgun in Tel Aviv during the Altalena revolt.

On 12 July 1948, during Operation Danny, Kelman was in command of the 3rd Battalion in Lydda. After an outbreak of gunfire his troops were ordered to shoot at "any clear target" and at anyone "seen on the streets". In two and a half hours "some 250" people were killed "and many wounded." Kelman subsequently transferred to the Negev Brigade and took part in Operation Yoav.

After the 1947-49 war
Kelman remained in the army until 1951. He then went to the United States to study economics and industrial engineering at Columbia University. After completing a BA, he returned to Israel, where he worked as an investment consultant and in the design and construction of factories and industrial zones.

References

Palmach members
1923 births
1980 deaths